Hermosillo International Airport , also known by its ceremonial name, General Ignacio L. Pesqueira International Airport (Aeropuerto Internacional General Ignacio L. Pesqueira), is an international airport located in Hermosillo, Sonora, Mexico. The airport handles several domestic flights, as well as flights to the U.S. cities of Phoenix and Dallas.

Information
 
The current airport was inaugurated in the year 1982, to replace the former airfield previously located in an area known as La Manga.

The facility is composed of one main runway (5/23), taxiways, hangars, and a commercial terminal which has capacity for 9 or more aircraft.

The airport normally serves as the primary alternate airport for flights headed to Tijuana International Airport due to unfavorable weather at Tijuana or other technical problems. The airport's runways and taxiways were widened during the early 2000s so as to handle heavy aircraft that may divert, like Aeroméxico's Boeing 787 on several occasions.

Aeroméxico operated a hub out of Hermosillo for many years. The hub connected cities throughout Mexico and also offered flights to the U.S. cities of Los Angeles and Phoenix. The hub was eventually downsized to a focus city, with it ultimately closing in 2017.

The airport is also a military base, denominated BAM-18, handling Mexican Air Force's flights.

The airport is named after Ignacio Pesqueira, a general who helped the Mexican army resist the French during the 19th century invasion.

It handled 1,559,900 passengers in 2021, and 1,945,400 passengers in 2022, an increase of 3.8%.

Airlines and destinations

Passenger

Cargo

Statistics

Passengers

Busiest Routes

See also
List of the busiest airports in Mexico

References

External links 
Hermosillo International Airport

Airports in Sonora
Hermosillo